The parchment codex called Littera Florentina is the closest survivor to an official version of the Digest of Roman law promulgated by Justinian I in 530–533. 

The codex, of 907 leaves, is written in the Byzantine-Ravenna uncials characteristic of Constantinople, but which has recently been recognized in legal and literary texts produced in Alexandria and the Levant as well. E.A. Lowe refers to this script as "b-r uncial". Close scrutiny dates the manuscript between the official issuance in 533 and the issuance of 557 that included Justinian's recent enactments, the Novellae Constitutiones, "New Constitutions", making it an all-but contemporary and all-but official source.

Marginal notes suggest that the codex was in Amalfi—part of the Byzantine territory in Italy governed by the Exarchate of Ravenna in the 6th century—and that it passed to Pisa in the 12th century; thus, during the Middle Ages the codex was known as the Littera Pisana, until the codex formed part of the war booty removed from Pisa to Florence after the war of 1406.

The manuscript became one of Florence's most treasured possessions. It was only shown to very important persons. Scholarly access was difficult. It took more than three centuries before a reliable edition of the Littera Florentina was finally made available. Nowadays two facsimile editions are at the disposal of scholars.

The importance of the manuscript lies in the fact that is an almost unique witness of the original Justinianian Digest. Most medieval manuscripts of the Digest have a substantially different text. Its sudden reappearance in the late eleventh or early twelfth century has been much debated by legal historians.

Notes

Enrico Spagnesi, Le Pandette di Giustiniano: storia e fortuna della 'Littera Florentina': mostra di codici  documenti, (exhibition catalogue)  June-August 1983 (Florence: Olschki) 1983.

See also 
 Corpus Juris Civilis
 Byzantine law
 Glossators

Bibliography 
Bernardo Moraes, Manual de Introdução ao Digesto, São Paulo, YK Editora, 2017.

External links
Gianfranco Purpura, "La Littera Florentina" (in Italian)
The Roman Law Library by Professor Yves Lassard and Alexandr Koptev
Discussion of the place of the Littera Florentina within Roman legal tradition
Pdf including illustrations of the Littera Florentina

6th-century Latin books
Law books
Byzantine law
Latin prose texts
Roman law
6th-century manuscripts
Justinian I